Mohammad Aftab (born 14 August 1996) is a Pakistani cricketer. He made his first-class debut for Lahore Blues in the 2016–17 Quaid-e-Azam Trophy on 7 October 2016.

References

External links
 

1996 births
Living people
Pakistani cricketers
Lahore Blues cricketers
Cricketers from Lahore